Riḍwān (or Riswan), is an angel in Islam, who guards the gates of heaven. His name is absent in the Quran and early tafsir, named by Ibn Hisham Ismāʿīl instead, he namely appears in later reports and Mi'raj narration. Ridwan also plays an important role as the guardian of heaven in the Qisas Al-Anbiya, here he must prevent Iblis from entering the keep of Adam, but was tricked by a serpent, who consealed Iblis in his mouth, carrying him past the guardian. His name probably developed from the Quranic term riḍwan. However, in the Quranic usage, it does not refer to an angel.

See also 
 List of angels in theology
 Gadreel
 Maalik
 Răzvan
 Rizvan
 Ridvan

References

Angels in Islam
Individual angels
Jannah